William Gordon Thompson (10 August 1921 – 26 December 1986) was a Scottish footballer who played in the Football League as a wing half for Portsmouth and Bournemouth & Boscombe Athletic. He went on to manage clubs in England and the Netherlands.

Life and career

Born in Glasgow, Thompson played for Scottish junior club Carnoustie Panmure before joining Portsmouth. He was a member of Portsmouth's championship-winning team of 1949 and 1950. His only goals for the club came on the last day of the 1949–50 season, playing as an emergency centre-forward. Needing to beat Aston Villa to ensure they stayed ahead of Wolverhampton Wanderers on goal average, Thompson scored twice in a 5–1 win. He went on to play in the League for Bournemouth & Boscombe Athletic and in non-league football for Guildford City.

Thompson took over as manager of Guildford City towards the end of the 1955–56 Southern League season, in which they won the title. In May 1957, he was the pick of more than thirty applicants for the post of manager at Third Division South club Exeter City, but lasted only until January 1958, when the club announced his departure by mutual agreement, though Thompson himself said he had been sacked. A few days later, he was appointed manager of Southern League Worcester City, leading them to victory against Liverpool in the 1958–59 FA Cup and remaining in post until 1962.

He went on to coach abroad, including in the Netherlands with Sparta Rotterdam from 1963 to 1966 and HFC Haarlem from 1970 to 1971.

References 

1921 births
1986 deaths
Footballers from Glasgow
Scottish footballers
Association football midfielders
Carnoustie Panmure F.C. players
Portsmouth F.C. players
AFC Bournemouth players
Guildford City F.C. players
Scottish Junior Football Association players
English Football League players
Southern Football League players
Scottish football managers
Scottish expatriate football managers
Guildford City F.C. managers
Exeter City F.C. managers
Worcester City F.C. managers
Sparta Rotterdam managers
Southern Football League managers
English Football League managers
Eredivisie managers
Scottish expatriate sportspeople in the Netherlands
Expatriate football managers in the Netherlands